Poldarsa is a rural locality (a village) in Opokskoye Rural Settlement, Velikoustyugsky District, Vologda Oblast, Russia. The population was 76 as of 2002.

Geography 
Poldarsa is located 65 km southwest of Veliky Ustyug (the district's administrative centre) by road. Poldarsa (settlement) is the nearest rural locality.

References 

Rural localities in Velikoustyugsky District